The superorder Peracarida is a large group of malacostracan crustaceans, having members in marine, freshwater, and terrestrial habitats. They are chiefly defined by the presence of a brood pouch, or marsupium, formed from thin flattened plates (oostegites) borne on the basalmost segments of the legs. Peracarida is one of the largest crustacean taxa and includes about 12,000 species. The earliest known perecaridian was Oxyuropoda ligioides, a fossil of which has been found dating to the Late Devonian (more than 360 mya) of Ireland.

Characteristics

The most obvious characteristic of the group is the marsupium in females. This brood pouch is enclosed by the large, flexible oostergites, bristly flaps which extend from the basal segments of the thoracic appendages, which form the floor of a chamber roofed by the animal's sternum. This chamber is where the eggs are brooded, development being direct in most cases. Other characteristics include the possession of a single pair of maxillipeds (rarely 2–3), of mandibles with an articulated accessory process between the molar and incisor teeth in the adults (called the lacinia mobilis), and of a carapace which is often reduced in size and is not fused with the posterior thoracic somites. In some orders, the young hatch at a post-larval, prejuvenile stage called a manca which lacks the last pair of legs. In the underground order Thermosbaenacea, there are no oostergites and the carapace of the female is expanded to form a dorsal marsupium.

Orders

There is some disagreement as to which orders should be included within Peracarida. Martin & Davies include the following eleven orders:
Amphipoda Latreille, 1816
Cumacea Krøyer, 1846
Isopoda Latreille, 1817
Lophogastrida Sars, 1870
Mictacea Bowman, Garner, Hessler, Iliffe & Sanders, 1985
Mysida Haworth, 1825
†Pygocephalomorpha Beurlen, 1930 (only known from fossil remains)
Spelaeogriphacea Gordon, 1957
Tanaidacea Dana, 1849
Thermosbaenacea Monod, 1927

but Ruppert, Fox and Barnes exclude Thermosbaenacea and place it in a separate order, Pancarida. They also place Lophogastrida, Mysida and Pygocephalomorpha in a single order, Mysidacea. This arrangement is disputed by Meland and Willassen who found that molecular data shows that the three orders are not closely related.

References

External links 

Malacostraca
Arthropod superorders